SM Southmall or SM Southmall Las Piñas is a large shopping mall in the Philippines, owned and operated by SM Prime Holdings. The mall is located along the busy Alabang-Zapote Road in Las Piñas. It is currently the 7th largest SM Supermall in the Philippines after SM Mall of Asia, SM City North EDSA, SM Megamall, SM Seaside City Cebu, SM City Fairview and SM City Cebu.

History 

SM Southmall opened on April 2, 1995, and is the first SM Supermall in the southern region of Metro Manila and the 5th SM Supermall ever built by Chinese-Filipino businessman, Henry Sy. The mall was the second SM Supermall to feature an Ice Skating Rink after SM Megamall. Construction for the mall began in early 1994.

In March 2010, SM Southmall began renovations which many stores on the second floor have closed with some stalls on the sides offering small items on sale. During the redevelopment saw a newly refurbished SM Store, which relocated from the center of the mall to the side to accommodate more fashion stores and the addition of the IMAX cinema which was opened last July 14, 2011. The SM Storyland theme park was closed in May 2011 and was part of the renovation, however some of its rides and attractions were moved at the SM By the Bay Amusement Park at the Mall of Asia Complex. The fashion stores opened in December 2011 along with the grand re-launch in November 2012 (which formally ended the renovation process and declared the mall as a 'premier SM mall').

SM Southmall attracts global retailers including Swedish fashion giant H&M which opened on October 29, 2015, and Uniqlo which opened on November 7, 2014.

Miss World 2013 Megan Young became the new mall brand ambassador as part of the #SeeYouDownSouth campaign on August 7, 2019.

Features

SM Southmall has over 400 shops and service outlets, with six anchor stores. Among the noteworthy features of the mall are its center and south atriums. The center atrium, which once housed a large indoor fountain, is used for events such as concerts and presentations. The mall also features a skating rink at the second floor and a bowling center at the lower ground floor, that opened in May 2013 and closed in March 2020.

Food Street
The Food Street at the back of the main mall is a group of restaurants which offers outdoor dining amid plants and an LED-lighted fountain.

SM Game Park
The SM Game Park is an entertainment facility located at the East Wing of the mall, occupying the original Cinema 4 and opened on December 3, 2021. It features a 14-lane bowling area (relocated from the lower ground floor, which the former space was now a Driftito indoor go-kart center), billiards, archery, table tennis, and a videoke bar. The SM Game Park is also the home of the UFC Gym which opened on June 18, 2022.

SM Cinema

SM Cinema Southmall, which formally opened in late 1995, consists of 9 cinemas with 5 regular cinemas, 1 Event Cinema, 2 Director's Club Cinemas and 1 IMAX Theater, it originally features 10 regular cinemas.

IMAX

The IMAX theater opened on July 14, 2011, along with the release of Harry Potter and the Deathly Hallows – Part 2, it has a seating capacity of 440, and it is located at the West Wing of the mall. It is the fourth IMAX theater in the country after SM Mall of Asia, SM City North EDSA, and SM City Cebu.

Director's Club Cinema
Two Director's Club Cinemas were opened on April 24, 2019, along with the premiere day of Avengers: Endgame, equipped with Dolby Atmos sound system and Christie CP2320-RGB pure laser cinema projector.

Redevelopment and renovation
Three cinemas in the West Wing (Cinemas 6–8) were temporarily closed on February 18, 2019, for renovation works, and re-opened on December 25 (Christmas Day), 2019, along with the celebration of the 2019 Metro Manila Film Festival (5 days after SM Mall of Asia opened their new cinemas on soft opening), with the new Cinemas 1 and 2  equipped with digital surround sound, premium seating and advanced laser projection, and a 45-seat Event Cinema (also the second Event Cinema branch after SM Mall of Asia that opened on December 12, 2018). Current Cinemas 6 and 7, which were the old Cinemas 1 and 2 at the East Wing, remained open in temporary operations and were closed on February 27, 2020. Old Cinemas 3 and 4 were closed on February 10, 2020, and re-opened in the renovated wing on February 13, 2020. The old Cinema 5 was closed on February 25, 2020, and re-opened in the renovated wing on February 27, 2020. The former cinema wing was now occupied by SM Game Park at the former Cinema 4, and a skating rink relocated from the food court at the second floor. The former spaces of Cinemas 1-3 and 5 are currently reserved.

Mall complex developments

South Residences at SM Southmall
The South Residences at SM Southmall is a condominium with four 15-storey towers. It is located at the south parking area near the entrance gate to Pilar Village.

SM South Tower
One of the main attractions in this building was the Bounce trampoline park, which was now closed due to the COVID-19 pandemic in the Philippines.

Incidents
August 2, 2004: Five security guards and bank escorts were wounded when 10 armed men fired shots at them before taking two bags of cash from Banco de Oro.
August 5, 2017: A councilor from Pasay was hurt in a shooting incident at the mall's driveway near Door 4 (back entrance) at around 8:30 PM. Senior Superintendent Marion Balonglong, Las Piñas City Police chief, identified the injured local official as Borbie Rivera. He was declared dead on arrival at the Asian Hospital and Medical Center in Muntinlupa.

Gallery

See also
 SM Center Las Piñas
 SM Supermalls
 Alabang Town Center
 Festival Mall
 Evia Lifestyle Center
 List of largest shopping malls
 List of largest shopping malls in the Philippines
 List of shopping malls in Metro Manila

References

External links

Shopping malls in Las Piñas
Buildings and structures in Las Piñas
SM Prime
Shopping malls established in 1995